Kelaneh is known primarily for being a type of bread, but the term encompasses a full meal that is particular to Kurdistan. In spring, the bread is filled with wheat flour and a kind of honeysuckle called ivy, while in other seasons onions are the filling.
Traditionally this flatbread is filled with scallion (or chives or wild garlic) and made them a smaller size to fit in a frying pan on a home stove compared to the convex metal griddle over an open fire (saj)

References

Middle Eastern cuisine
Kurdish cuisine
Kurdish words and phrases
Iranian breads
Iranian cuisine